The Montana University System (MUS) was created on July 1, 1994, when the Montana Board of Regents of Higher Education restructured the state's public colleges and universities, with the goal of streamlining the state's higher education in the wake of decreased state funding. It has sixteen campuses divided among the two state university systems,  and community colleges.

Universities
Each university subsystem has campuses around the state, with a university President at the main campus, Chancellors at each of the three smaller units, and Deans/CEOs at the two-year comprehensive colleges. The main campus gives administrative and library assistance to the smaller units, but each unit sets its own curriculum with Board of Regents approval.

The University of Montana System
University of Montana (flagship campus, in Missoula)
Missoula College University of Montana (in Missoula)
University of Montana Western (in Dillon)
Montana Technological University (in Butte)
Highlands College of Montana Tech (in Butte) 
Helena College University of Montana (in Helena)
Bitterroot College University of Montana (in Hamilton)

Montana State University System
Montana State University (flagship campus, in Bozeman)
Gallatin College Montana State University (in Bozeman)
Montana State University Billings (in Billings)
City College at Montana State University Billings (in Billings)
Montana State University–Northern (in Havre)
Great Falls College Montana State University (in Great Falls)

Community Colleges
Dawson Community College (in Glendive)
Flathead Valley Community College (in Kalispell)
Miles Community College (in Miles City)

References

 
 
  
Montana
1994 establishments in Montana